Brett Sorensen is a former American slalom canoeist who competed in the early 1980s. He won a bronze medal in the mixed C-2 event at the 1981 ICF Canoe Slalom World Championships in Bala, Gwynedd, Wales.

References
ICF medalists for Olympic and World Championships - Part 2: rest of flatwater (now sprint) and remaining canoeing disciplines: 1936-2007.

American male canoeists
Living people
Year of birth missing (living people)
Medalists at the ICF Canoe Slalom World Championships